"Gift" is the third single from singer Maaya Sakamoto. It was released in Japan on September 22, 1997. "Gift" was used as the second ending song for the Clamp School Detectives anime.

Track listing
Gift

References

External links
 

1997 singles
1997 songs
Maaya Sakamoto songs
Victor Entertainment singles
Anime songs
Songs written by Yoko Kanno
Songs with lyrics by Yuho Iwasato